Burton's Biscuit Company is a British biscuit manufacturer. It is recognised in the UK as the second-biggest supplier of biscuits. The company was formed by the merger of Burton's Gold Medal Biscuits and Horizon Biscuit Company in October 2000. It re-branded from Burton's Foods to Burton's Biscuit Company in November 2011. It employs over 2,200 people around the UK, in three main manufacturing facilities, Llantarnam, Edinburgh and Blackpool, a chocolate refinery in Moreton, and a central distribution hub in Liverpool. Its head office is in St Albans.

Burton's is the UK's number two biscuit maker and many of its products are sold globally.

History 
The first Burton's biscuits were baked by George Burton (born 1829, Leek, Staffordshire), who began production on Corporation Street, Blackpool, Lancashire. The Burton's Biscuits firm was founded by George's grandson, Joseph Burton, in 1935. It had a factory in Slough, Berkshire, until the early 1980s, manufacturing potato crisps and snacks, including Potato Puffs and Fish 'n' Chips savoury snacks. In 2014, Burton's re-launched their Fish 'n' Chips snacks due to popular demand.

In 2000, the business was sold by Associated British Foods to Hicks Muse Tate & Furst. On 18 March 2007, Burton's was acquired by Duke Street Capital. In September 2009, Burton's came under the new ownership of Canadian Imperial Bank of Commerce and Apollo Global Management, with a minority stake held by Duke Street.

In 2013, the company was put up for sale, with an asking price around £350m. In November of that year, it was announced that the company had been bought by the Ontario Teachers' Pension Plan.

In 2016, Burton's sold its licence to make Cadbury-branded biscuits to Mondelēz International (the owners of Cadbury), although they are still made in Burton's factories.

In June 2021, it was announced that the company had been bought by the Ferrero SpA.

Brands

Jammie Dodgers
Lyons Biscuits
 Lyons Coconut Delights
 Lyons Cookies
 Lyons Digestive
 Lyons Fig Rolls
 Lyons Jam Teacakes
 Lyons Toffypops
Viscount
Maryland Cookies
Royal Edinburgh
Wagon Wheels

See also
Fox's Biscuits
Huntley & Palmers
Jacob Fruitfield Food Group and Jacob's
Tunnock's
United Biscuits

References

External links 

Ferrero SpA
Snack food manufacturers of the United Kingdom
Private equity portfolio companies
Companies based in the City and District of St Albans
2021 mergers and acquisitions
Biscuit brands
British subsidiaries of foreign companies